Matthew Olson is a retired American soccer goalkeeper.

Player

Youth
Olson graduated from Lindbergh Senior High School.  In 1986, he began his collegiate career at Indiana University where he won the 1988 NCAA Division I Men's Soccer Championship.  He then transferred to Wake Forest where he played the 1989 (ACC Champions) and 1990 seasons (#4 Ranking, NCAA Tournament - 2nd round).

Professional
In 1989, Olson played for the Seattle Storm in the Western Soccer Alliance.  In 1995, he played for the Everett BigFoot.  In February 1996, D.C. United selected Olson in the thirteenth round (130th overall) of the 1996 MLS Inaugural Player Draft.  On March 4, 1996, D.C. United then traded Olson to the MetroStars.  On April 15, 1996, the MetroStars released Olson.  Olson was picked up by the New England Revolution.  He then signed with the Hampton Roads Mariners for the 1996 season where he was named to the USISL All-Star team.  He later re-joined D.C. United and was a member of the 1996 MLS Cup Championship team. In early 1997, Olson suffered a broken leg but returned to the USISL later in the year to play two games for the Carolina Dynamo.

He also has experience of playing in Europe having trials at Luton Town, Wolverhampton Wanderers, West Bromwich Albion and playing a few first team games at Cheltenham Town as well as spending time with clubs in Sweden Hammarby and AIK Stockholm and Holland Vitesse Arnhem and Ajax Amsterdam.

Coach
In 1992, Olson joined the Washington Huskies as a goalkeeper coach, a position he held until 1996.  In 1997, he spent one season as the goalkeeper coach at his alma mater, Wake Forest.  In 1998, he became the girls' soccer coach at Skyline High School where he was the 2000 King County Coach of the Year.  Over his seven seasons with Skyline, Olson took the team to a 62-26-11 record and third and fourth-place finish in the 3A WIAA state championships.  On February 23, 2004, he returned to the Washington Huskies as an assistant coach.  He also served as the goalkeeper coach for the Trinity Lutheran College women's team.  He is currently working as a Director at Eagleclaw FC and as a Staff Instructor with the National Soccer Coaches Association of America (NSCAA).

References

Living people
American soccer coaches
American soccer players
North Carolina Fusion U23 players
Cheltenham Town F.C. players
National League (English football) players
Everett BigFoot players
Seattle Storm (soccer) players
Virginia Beach Mariners players
Indiana Hoosiers men's soccer players
Wake Forest Demon Deacons men's soccer players
Western Soccer Alliance players
Sportspeople from Renton, Washington
Association football goalkeepers
Year of birth missing (living people)